"All Around The World" is a song by Mexican pop artist Paulina Rubio from her album, Brava!. The song was written by RedOne, Paulina Rubio, AJ Junior, Bilial Hajil, Jimmy Joker, Teddy Skyand produced by RedOne, Joker, Sky. This song was used as the official theme song for the 2012 Zumba Fitness “Party in Pink” campaign.

“The message, the vibe, the energy… Zumba and I are a fit,” Rubio told Latina magazine about her new partnership with Zumba. “Tonight is the perfect night to debut the single because it’s all about enthusiasm. It’s all about energy, and about reaching people from all around the globe. Zumba does that and so does my music. That’s why we’re here tonight.” 

This song, which was rumored to be a single, can also be found on the singer's most recent EPs, Brava! Reload and Bravísima!

Live performances
Paulina performed the song during Zumba's “Fitness-Concert.”

References

Paulina Rubio songs
English-language Mexican songs
Song recordings produced by RedOne
Songs written by RedOne
2011 songs
Songs written by Geraldo Sandell
Songs written by Paulina Rubio
Songs written by Bilal Hajji
Songs written by AJ Junior
Songs written by Jimmy Thörnfeldt